APUD cells (DNES cells) constitute a group of apparently unrelated endocrine cells, which were named by the scientist A.G.E. Pearse, who developed the APUD concept in the 1960s based on calcitonin-secreting parafollicular C cells of dog thyroid. These cells share the common function of secreting a low molecular weight polypeptide hormone. There are several different types which secrete the hormones secretin, cholecystokinin and several others. The name is derived from an acronym, referring to the following:
 Amine Precursor Uptake – for high uptake of amine precursors including 5-hydroxytryptophan (5-HTP) and dihydroxyphenylalanine (DOPA).
 Decarboxylase – for high content of the enzyme amino acid decarboxylase (for conversion of precursors to amines).

Cells in APUD system 

 Adenohypophysis
 Neurons of Hypothalamus
 C-cells of Thyroid
 Chief Cells of Parathyroid
 Adrenal Medullary Cells
 Glomus cells in Carotid Body
 Melanocytes of Skin
 Cells of Pineal Gland
 Renin producing cells in the kidney

See also 

 Apudoma
 Enteroendocrine cell
 Neuroendocrine cell
List of human cell types derived from the germ layers

References

External links
 

Endocrine cells